Satai is a town and a nagar panchayat in Chhatarpur district in the Indian state of Madhya Pradesh.

Demographics
 India census, Satai had a population of 8293. Males constitute 53% of the population and females 47%. Satai has an average literacy rate of 40%, lower than the national average of 59.5%: male literacy is 52%, and female literacy is 27%. In Satai, 21% of the population is under 6 years of age.

References

Bundelkhand
Chhatarpur